The Association of Autonomous Astronauts is a worldwide network of community-based groups dedicated to building their own spaceships. The AAA was founded 23 April 1995. Although many of their activities were reported as serious participation in conferences or protests against the militarization of space, some were also considered art pranks, media pranks, or elaborate spoof. The AAA had numerous local chapters which operated independently of one another, with the AAA effectively operating as a collective pseudonym along the lines of Luther Blissett (nom de plume).

The Association's ostensible five-year mission, a reference to Star Trek, was to "establish a planetary network to end the monopoly of corporations, governments and the military over travel in space". Artists who became involved were often connected to the zine scene or mail art movements. The five-year mission's completion was marked at the 2000 Fortean Times conference. Some chapters have continued activities to the present day. Several AAAers have experienced zero-gravity training flights.

The writer Tom Hodgkinson described participants as "a loose bunch of Marxists, futurists, and revolutionaries on the dole", going on to explicate their mission as "reclaim[ing] the idea of space travel for the common man". To the AAA, he said, "space travel represented an ideal of freedom". Annick Bureaud of Leonardo/OLATS viewed their work as "space art" that "combine[d] freely space, cyberspace, raves, esoteric things, techno-music, etc.", calling attention to "how they recycle ... key images (the MIR Space Station, the astronauts on the Moon, etc.) ... mixed with science-fiction (and specially Star Trek) buzz-words or images" and then subjected these "sacred icons" to "iconoclastic treatments".

In his book Unleashing the Collective Phantoms, the theorist Brian Holmes said of the AAA: "The ideas sound fantastic, but the stakes are real: imagining a political subject within the virtual class, and therefore, within the economy of cultural production and intellectual property that had paralyzed the poetics of resistance."

The London chapter participated in the J18 Carnival Against Capitalism protests during that year's G8 summit, with a contingent of AAA members dressed in space suits delivering a petition against the militarisation of space to the headquarters of Lockheed. The group was particularly concerned about the Cassini-Huygens spacecraft and its RTG power source performing an earth fly-by to boost its speed toward the outer Solar System.

Timeline

23 April 1995: Launch of the Association of Autonomous Astronauts in the grounds of Windsor Castle, UK.
23 April 1996: Publication of 1st Annual Report: "Here Comes Everybody!"
23 April 1997: Publication of 2nd Annual Report: "Dreamtime Is Upon Us!"
21–22 June 1997: 1st Intergalactic Conference – Public Netbase, Vienna, Austria
23 April 1998: Publication of 3rd Annual Report: "Moving in Several Directions At Once!"
18–19 April 1998: Intergalactic Conference – Link Centre, Bologna, Italy
23 April 1999: Publication of 4th Annual Report: "Space Travel By Any Means Necessary!"
18 – 27 June 1999: Space 1999: Ten Days Which Shook The Universe – various venues, London, UK. http://www.deepdisc.com/space1999/
23 April 2000: Publication of 5th Annual Report: "See You In Space!"
The 333 days : series of encounters following the 5YP, including Gravité Zéro festival in Paris
23 April 2005: AAA's ten-year encounter in Paris (http://confluences.net), in support to Steve Kurtz and the Critical Art Ensemble
23 April 2007 : AAA II Wake-Up Communique: "The Dream Is Just Beginning"

AAA groups and links
AAA mailing list: http://tech.groups.yahoo.com/group/aaacommunityspaceprogram/

AAA 333 Bologna (It)
AAA Anzio (It)
AAA Vienna (At) : http://aaa.t0.or.at
Raido AAA (UK) : http://www.uncarved.org/aaa.html
Nomad AAA
AAA Glasgow Cabal (UK)
AAA Kernow (UK) : http://www.myspace.com/bodminmoorexplorer
Disconaut AAA (UK) : http://www.uncarved.org/disconaut/
Dionysian AAA (UK) : http://www.angelfire.com/id/ASP/DAAA.html
Inner City AAA (UK)
East London AAA (UK)
Jungle AAA (Nl) : https://web.archive.org/web/20041224082447/http://www.socialfiction.org/jungleaaa/
Oceania AAA : http://www.deepdisc.com/aaa
AAA Aotearoa (NZ)
AAA Insurgent Cosmos
AAA Parasol (UK)
AAA Toronto (Ca) : http://mirmnp.blogspot.com
AAA Noordung (Si) : https://web.archive.org/web/20090815023929/http://www.postgravityart.org/
AAA Argentina
AAA Guyane (Fr)
Orgone AAA
AAA Paris Nord (Fr)
AAA Paris Sud (Fr)
AAA Montpellier (Fr)
AAA Amsterdam/Area 23 (Nl)
AAA 10 Year Anniversary Video Site : https://web.archive.org/web/20061231171346/http://semaphore.blogs.com/aaa/
Forum AAA Rosko (Fr) : http://www.rezoweb.com/forum/technologie/aaaroskoforum.shtml
AAA Twin Cities (Minnesota, USA)
AAA Porto (Pt)
AAA Chamberí (Madrid, Es)
AAA Space Arm Program (Ca) : https://web.archive.org/web/20130827095612/http://w----e.net/spacearm.html

Music
 "Rave In Space" CD (2000)
http://www.discogs.com/Various-Rave-In-Space/release/379802

Influences on other subcultures
Datacide magazine : https://web.archive.org/web/20050125235045/http://datacide.c8.com/
 London Psychogeographical Association : http://www.unpopular.demon.co.uk/lpa/organisations/lpa.html 
Gigabrother : https://web.archive.org/web/20180904053226/http://www.gigabrother.com/
The Laboratory Planet journal : http://www.laboratoryplanet.org

See also
Asgardia (nation)
El Club de los Astronautas
Space art

References

Further reading

 "The Conquest of Space in the Time of Power", The Situationist International N°12, 1969 : http://www.bopsecrets.org/SI/12.space.htm
 Mind Invaders: A Reader in Psychic Warfare, Cultural Sabotage and Semiotic Terrorism, Stewart Home, Serpent's Tail (London), 1997
An overview of Neoist activities in the 1990s, including highlights of the AAA's first two years.

 "Unleashing the Collective Phantoms", Brian Holmes, Autonomedia, USA, 2008
 A text discussing the AAA : http://www.republicart.net/disc/artsabotage/holmes01_en.htm

 "Anche Tu Astronauta: guida all'esplorazione independente dello spazio", Riccardo Balli, Castelvecchi editore, Roma, 1998
An insight in Italian language into AAA's philosophy, literature, history and future.
 The book is free online: https://archive.org/details/anche-tu-astronauta

 "Quitter la gravité", edited by Ewen Chardronnet, Editions de l'Eclat, Paris, 2001
 A selection of texts in french language into AAA's philosophy, literature, history and future.
 The book is free online in lyber : http://lyber-eclat.net/lyber/aaa/quitter_la_gravite.html

 "The Laboratory Planet" journal, in English and French : http://www.laboratoryplanet.org

External links
Red Giant
 http://world-information.org
OLATS, Observatoire Leonardo des Arts et Techno-Sciences
Makrolab
Acoustic Space Lab
El Club de los Astronautas, space agency founded by artists
Autonomous Space Agency Network

Organizations established in 1995
International artist groups and collectives
Private spaceflight
Space organizations
Psychogeography
International anarchist organizations